The NASA Astronaut Corps is a unit of the United States National Aeronautics and Space Administration (NASA) that selects, trains, and provides astronauts as crew members for U.S. and international space missions. It is based at Johnson Space Center in Houston, Texas.

History
The first U.S. astronaut candidates were selected by NASA in 1959, for its Project Mercury with the objective of orbiting astronauts around the Earth in single-man capsules. The military services were asked to provide a list of military test pilots who met specific qualifications. After stringent screening, NASA announced its selection of the "Mercury Seven" as its first astronauts. Since then, NASA has selected 22 more groups of astronauts, opening the corps to civilians, scientists, doctors, engineers, and school teachers. As of the 2009 Astronaut Class, 61% of the astronauts selected by NASA have come from military service.

NASA selects candidates from a diverse pool of applicants with a wide variety of backgrounds. From the thousands of applications received, only a few are chosen for the intensive astronaut candidate training program. Including the "Original Seven", 339 candidates have been selected to date.

Organization
The Astronaut Corps is based at the Lyndon B. Johnson Space Center in Houston, although members may be assigned to other locations based on mission requirements, e.g. Soyuz training at Star City, Russia.

The Chief of the Astronaut Office is the most senior leadership position for active astronauts in the Corps. The Chief Astronaut serves as head of the Corps and is the principal adviser to the NASA Administrator on astronaut training and operations. The first Chief Astronaut was Deke Slayton, appointed in 1962. The current Chief Astronaut is Joe Acaba.

Salary
Salaries for newly hired civilian astronauts are based on the federal government's General Schedule pay scale for grades GS-11 through GS-14. The astronaut's grade is based on his or her academic achievements and experience. Astronauts can be promoted up to grade GS-15. As of 2015, astronauts based at the Johnson Space Center in Houston, Texas, earn between $66,026 (GS-11 step 1) and $158,700 (GS-15 step 8 and above).

Military astronauts are detailed to the Johnson Space Center and remain on active duty for pay, benefits, leave, and similar military matters.

Qualifications
There are no age restrictions for the NASA Astronaut Corps. Astronaut candidates have ranged between the ages of 26 and 46, with the average age being 34. Candidates must be U.S. citizens to apply for the program.

There are three broad categories of qualifications: education, work experience, and medical.
 
Candidates must have a master's degree from an accredited institution in engineering, biological science, physical science or mathematics. The degree must be followed by at least two to three years of related, progressively responsible, professional experience (graduate work or studies) or at least 1,000 hours of pilot-in-command time in jet aircraft. An advanced degree is desirable and may be substituted for experience, such as a doctoral degree (which counts as the two years experience). Teaching experience, including experience at the K – 12 levels, is considered to be qualifying experience.

Candidates must have the ability to pass the NASA long-duration space flight physical, which includes the following specific requirements:
 Distant and near visual acuity: Must be correctable to 20/20, each eye separately (corrective lenses such as glasses are allowed)
 The refractive surgical procedures of the eye, PRK and LASIK, are allowed, providing at least 1 year has passed since the date of the procedure with no permanent adverse after effects.
 Blood pressure not to exceed 140/90 measured in a sitting position
 Standing height between 62 and 75 inches

Members

Astronauts
, the corps has 41 "active" astronauts consisting of 16 women and 25 men or 39.0% female and 61.0% male The highest number of active astronauts at one time was in 2000 when there were 149. All of the current astronaut corps are from the classes of 1996 (Group 16) or later.

There are currently 19 "international active astronauts", "who are assigned to duties at the Johnson Space Center", who were selected by their home agency to train as part of a NASA Astronaut Group and serve alongside their NASA counterparts. While the international astronauts, Payload Specialists, and Spaceflight Participants go through training with the NASA Astronaut Corps, they are not considered members of the corps.

Management astronauts
, the corps has 16 "management" astronauts, who remain NASA employees but are no longer eligible for flight assignment. The current  management astronauts are assigned to NASA operations as follows: Ames Research Center (one astronaut); Goddard Space Flight Center (one); Johnson Space Center (eleven) and NASA Headquarters (four). The current management astronauts includes personnel chosen to join the corps as early as 1985 (Group 11, Associate Administrator Robert D. Cabana) and as recently as 2009 (Group 20, Serena Auñón-Chancellor of medical and CAPCOM branches).

Astronaut candidates
The term "Astronaut Candidate" (informally "ASCAN") refers to individuals who have been selected by NASA as candidates for the NASA Astronaut Corps and are currently undergoing a candidacy training program at the Johnson Space Center. The most recent class of astronaut candidates was selected in 2021.

Only three astronaut candidates have resigned before completing training: Brian O'Leary and Anthony Llewellyn, both from the 1967 Selection Group, and Robb Kulin of the 2017 group. O'Leary resigned in April 1968 after additional Apollo missions were cancelled, Llewellyn resigned in August 1968 after failing to qualify as a jet pilot, and Kulin resigned in August 2018 for unspecified personal reasons. Another astronaut candidate, Stephen Thorne, died in an airplane accident before he could finish astronaut training.

Former members 
Selection as an astronaut candidate and subsequent promotion to astronaut does not guarantee the individual will eventually fly in space. Some have voluntarily resigned or been medically disqualified after becoming astronauts but before being selected for flights.

Civilian candidates are expected to remain with the corps for at least five years after initial training; military candidates are assigned for specific tours. After these time limits, members of the Astronaut Corps may resign or retire at any time.

Three members of the Astronaut Corps (Gus Grissom, Edward White, and Roger B. Chaffee) were killed during a ground test accident while preparing for the Apollo 1 mission. Eleven were killed during spaceflight, on Space Shuttle missions STS-51-L and STS-107. Another four (Elliot See, Charles Bassett, Theodore Freeman, and Clifton Williams) were killed in T-38 plane crashes during training for space flight during the Gemini and Apollo programs. Another was killed in a 1967 automobile accident, and another died in a 1991 commercial airliner crash while traveling on NASA business.

Two members of the corps have been involuntarily dismissed: Lisa Nowak and William Oefelein. Both were returned to service with the US Navy.

A
 James Adamson – STS-28, STS-43
 Thomas Akers – STS-41, STS-49, STS-61, STS-79
 Buzz Aldrin – Gemini 12, Apollo 11
 Andrew Allen – STS-46, STS-62, STS-75 
 Joseph Allen – STS-5, STS-51-A
 Scott Altman – STS-90, STS-106, STS-109, STS-125
 William Anders – Apollo 8
 Clayton Anderson – STS-117/STS-120 (Expedition 15), STS-131
 Michael Anderson – STS-89, STS-107
 Dominic Antonelli – STS-119, STS-132
 Jerome Apt – STS-37, STS-47, STS-59, STS-79
 Lee Archambault – STS-117, STS-119
 Neil Armstrong – Gemini 8, Apollo 11
 Richard Arnold – STS-119, Soyuz MS-08 (Expedition 55/56)
 Jeffrey Ashby – STS-93, STS-100, STS-112
 Serena Auñón-Chancellor – Soyuz MS-09 (Expedition 56/57)

B
 James Bagian – STS-29, STS-40
 Ellen Baker – STS-34, STS-50, STS-71
 Michael Baker – STS-43, STS-52, STS-68, STS-81
 Daniel Barry – STS-72, STS-96, STS-105 
 Charles Bassett
 Alan Bean – Apollo 12, Skylab 3
 Robert Behnken – STS-123, STS-130, SpaceX Demo-2 (Expedition 63)
 John Blaha – STS-29, STS-33, STS-43, STS-58, STS-79/STS-81 (Mir EO-22)
 Michael Bloomfield – STS-86, STS-97, STS-110
 Guion Bluford – STS-8, STS-61-A, STS-39, STS-53
 Karol Bobko – STS-6, STS-51-D, STS-51-J
 Charles Bolden – STS-61-C, STS-31, STS-45, STS-60
 Frank Borman – Gemini 7, Apollo 8
 Kenneth Bowersox – STS-50, STS-61, STS-73, STS-82, STS-113/Soyuz TMA-1 (Expedition 6)
 Charles Brady – STS-78
 Vance Brand – Apollo-Soyuz Test Project, STS-5, STS-41B, STS-35
 Daniel Brandenstein – STS-8, STS-51-G, STS-32, STS-49
 Roy Bridges – STS-51-F
 Curtis Brown – STS-47, STS-66, STS-77, STS-85, STS-95, STS-103
 David Brown – STS-107 
 Mark Brown – STS-28, STS-48
 James Buchli – STS-51-C, STS-61-A, STS-29, STS-48
 John Bull
 Daniel Burbank – STS-106, STS-115, Soyuz TMA-22 (Expedition 29/30)
 Daniel Bursch – STS-51, STS-68, STS-77, STS-108/STS-111 (Expedition 4)

C
 Robert Cabana – STS-41, STS-53, STS-65, STS-88
 Yvonne Cagle
 Fernando Caldeiro
 Charles Camarda – STS-114
 Kenneth Cameron – STS-37, STS-56, STS-74 
 Duane Carey – STS-109
 Scott Carpenter – Mercury-Atlas 7
 Gerald Carr – Skylab 4
 Sonny Carter – STS-33
 John Casper – STS-36, STS-54, STS-62, STS-77
 Christopher Cassidy – STS-127, Soyuz TMA-08M (Expedition 35/36), Soyuz MS-16 (Expedition 62/63)
 Gene Cernan – Gemini 9A, Apollo 10, Apollo 17
 Roger Chaffee – Apollo 1
 Gregory Chamitoff – STS-124/STS-126 (Expedition 17/18), STS-134
 Franklin Chang-Diaz – STS-61-C, STS-34, STS-46, STS-60, STS-75, STS-91, STS-111
 Philip Chapman
 Kalpana Chawla – STS-87, STS-107
 Leroy Chiao – STS-65, STS-72, STS-92, Soyuz TMA-5 (Expedition 10)
 Kevin Chilton – STS-49, STS-59, STS-76
 Laurel Clark – STS-107
 Mary Cleave – STS-61-B, STS-30
 Michael Clifford – STS-53, STS-59, STS-76
 Michael Coats – STS-41-D, STS-29, STS-39
 Kenneth Cockrell – STS-56, STS-69, STS-80, STS-98, STS-111
 Catherine Coleman – STS-73, STS-93, Soyuz TMA-20 (Expedition 26/27)
 Eileen Collins – STS-63, STS-84, STS-93, STS-114
 Michael Collins – Gemini 10, Apollo 11
 Pete Conrad – Gemini 5, Gemini 11, Apollo 12, Skylab 2
 Gordon Cooper – Mercury-Atlas 9, Gemini 5
 Richard Covey – STS-51-I, STS-26, STS-38, STS-61
 Timothy Creamer – Soyuz TMA-17 (Expedition 22/23)
 John Creighton – STS-51-G, STS-36, STS-48
 Robert Crippen – STS-1, STS-7, STS-41-C, STS-41-G
 Frank Culbertson – STS-38, STS-51, STS-105/STS-108 (Expedition 3)
 Walter Cunningham – Apollo 7
 Robert Curbeam – STS-85, STS-98, STS-116
 Nancy Currie – STS-57, STS-70, STS-88, STS-109

D
 Jan Davis – STS-47, STS-60, STS-85
 Alvin Drew – STS-118, STS-133
 Brian Duffy – STS-45, STS-57, STS-72, STS-92
 Charles Duke – Apollo 16
 Bonnie Dunbar – STS-61-A, STS-32, STS-50, STS-71, STS-89
 James Dutton – STS-131

E
 Joe Edwards – STS-89
 Donn Eisele – Apollo 7
 Anthony England – STS-51-F
 Joe Engle – ALT, STS-2, STS-51I
 Ronald Evans – Apollo 17

F
 John Fabian – STS-7, STS-51-G
 Christopher Ferguson – STS-115, STS-126, STS-135
 Jack Fischer – Soyuz MS-04 (Expedition 52/53)
 Anna Fisher – STS-51-A
 William Fisher – STS-51-I
 Michael Foale – STS-45, STS-56, STS-63, STS-84/STS-86 (Mir EO-23/24), STS-103, Soyuz TMA-3 (Expedition 8)
 Kevin Ford – STS-128, Soyuz TMA-06M (Expedition 33/34)
 Michael Foreman – STS-123, STS-129
 Patrick Forrester – STS-105, STS-117, STS-128
 Michael Fossum – STS-121, STS-124, Soyuz TMA-02M (Expedition 28/29)
 Theodore Freeman
 Stephen Frick – STS-110, STS-122
 C. Gordon Fullerton – ALT, STS-3, STS-51-F

G
 Ronald Garan – STS-124, Soyuz TMA-21 (Expedition 27/28)
 Dale Gardner – STS-8, STS-51-A
 Guy Gardner – STS-27, STS-35
 Owen Garriott – Skylab 3, STS-9
 Charles Gemar – STS-38, STS-48, STS-62
 Michael Gernhardt – STS-69, STS-83, STS-94, STS-104
 Edward Gibson – Skylab 4
 Robert Gibson – STS-41-B, STS-61-C, STS-27, STS-47, STS-71
 Edward Givens
 John Glenn – Mercury-Atlas 6, STS-95
 Linda Godwin – STS-37, STS-59, STS-76, STS-108
 Michael Good – STS-125, STS-132
 Richard Gordon – Gemini 11, Apollo 12
 Dominic Gorie – STS-91, STS-99, STS-108, STS-123
 Ronald Grabe – STS-51-J, STS-30, STS-42, STS-57
 Duane Graveline
 Frederick Gregory – STS-51-B, STS-33, STS-44
 William Gregory – STS-67
 S. David Griggs – STS-51-D
 Gus Grissom – Mercury-Redstone 4, Gemini 3, Apollo 1
 John Grunsfeld – STS-67, STS-81, STS-103, STS-109, STS-125
 Sidney Gutierrez – STS-40, STS-59

H
 Fred Haise – Apollo 13, ALT
 James Halsell – STS-65, STS-74, STS-83, STS-94, STS-101
 Kenneth Ham – STS-124, STS-132
 Blaine Hammond – STS-39, STS-64
 Gregory Harbaugh – STS-39, STS-54, STS-71, STS-82
 Bernard Harris – STS-55, STS-63
 Terry Hart – STS-41-C
 Henry Hartsfield – STS-4, STS-41-D, STS-61-A
 Frederick Hauck – STS-7, STS-51-A, STS-26
 Stephen Hawley – STS-41-D, STS-61-C, STS-31, STS-82, STS-93
 Susan Helms – STS-54, STS-64, STS-78, STS-101, STS-102/STS-105 (Expedition 2)
 Karl Henize – STS-51-F
 Terence Henricks – STS-44, STS-55, STS-70, STS-78
 Jose Hernandez – STS-128
 John Herrington – STS-113
 Richard Hieb – STS-39, STS-49, STS-65
 Joan Higginbotham – STS-116
 David Hilmers – STS-51-J, STS-26, STS-36, STS-42
 Kathryn Hire – STS-90, STS-130
 Charles Hobaugh – STS-104, STS-118, STS-129
 Jeffrey Hoffman – STS-51-D, STS-35, STS-46, STS-61, STS-75
 Donald Holmquest
 Scott Horowitz – STS-75, STS-82, STS-101, STS-105
 Douglas Hurley – STS-127, STS-135, SpaceX Demo-2 (Expedition 63)
 Rick Husband – STS-96, STS-107

I
 James Irwin – Apollo 15
 Marsha Ivins – STS-32, STS-46, STS-62, STS-81, STS-98

J
 Mae Jemison – STS-47
 Tamara Jernigan – STS-40, STS-52, STS-67, STS-80, STS-96
 Brent Jett – STS-72, STS-81, STS-97, STS-115
 Gregory C. Johnson – STS-125
 Gregory H. Johnson – STS-123, STS-134
 Thomas Jones – STS-59, STS-68, STS-80, STS-98

K
 Janet Kavandi – STS-91, STS-99, STS-104
 James Kelly – STS-102, STS-114
 Mark Kelly – STS-108, STS-121, STS-124, STS-134
 Scott Kelly – STS-103, STS-118, Soyuz TMA-01M (Expedition 25/26), Soyuz TMA-16M/Soyuz TMA-18M (Expedition 43/44/45/46)
 Joseph Kerwin – Skylab 2
 Robert Kimbrough – STS-126, Soyuz MS-02 (Expedition 49/50), SpaceX Crew-2 (Expedition 65/66)
 Timothy Kopra – STS-127/STS-128 (Expedition 20), Soyuz TMA-19M (Expedition 46/47)
 Kevin Kregel – STS-70, STS-78, STS-87, STS-99

L
 Wendy Lawrence – STS-67, STS-86, STS-91, STS-114
 Mark Lee – STS-30, STS-47, STS-64, STS-82
 David Leestma – STS-41-G, STS-28, STS-45
 William Lenoir – STS-5
 Don Lind – STS-51-B
 Steven Lindsey – STS-87, STS-95, STS-104, STS-121, STS-133
 Jerry Linenger – STS-64, STS-81/STS-84 (Mir EO-22/23)
 Richard Linnehan – STS-78, STS-90, STS-109, STS-123
 Paul Lockhart – STS-111, STS-113
 Michael Lopez-Alegria – STS-73, STS-92, STS-113, Soyuz TMA-9 (Expedition 14), Axiom Mission 1
 Christopher Loria
 John Lounge – STS-51-I, STS-26, STS-35
 Jack Lousma – Skylab 3, STS-3
 Stanley Love – STS-122
 Jim Lovell – Gemini 7, Gemini 12, Apollo 8, Apollo 13
 G. David Low – STS-32, STS-43, STS-57
 Edward Lu – STS-84, STS-104, Soyuz TMA-2 (Expedition 7)
 Shannon Lucid – STS-51-G, STS-34, STS-43, STS-58, STS-76/STS-79 (Mir EO-21/22)

M
 Sandra Magnus – STS-112, STS-126/STS-119 (Expedition 18), STS-135
 Thomas Marshburn – STS-127, Soyuz TMA-07M (Expedition 34/35), SpaceX Crew-3 (Expedition 66/67)
 Michael Massimino – STS-109, STS-125
 Richard Mastracchio – STS-106, STS-118, STS-131, Soyuz TMA-11M (Expedition 38/39)
 Ken Mattingly – Apollo 16, STS-4, STS-51-C
 William McArthur – STS-58, STS-74, STS-92, Soyuz TMA-7 (Expedition 12)
 Jon McBride – STS-41-B
 Bruce McCandless – STS-41-B, STS-31
 William McCool – STS-107
 Michael McCulley – STS-34
 James McDivitt – Gemini 4, Apollo 9
 Donald McMonagle – STS-39, STS-54, STS-66
 Ronald McNair – STS-41-B, STS-51-L
 Carl Meade – STS-38, STS-50, STS-64
 Bruce Melnick – STS-41, STS-49
 Pamela Melroy – STS-92, STS-112, STS-120
 Leland Melvin – STS-122, STS-129
 Dorothy Metcalf-Lindenburger – STS-131
 Curt Michel
 Edgar Mitchell – Apollo 14
 Barbara Morgan – STS-118
 Lee Morin – STS-110
 Mike Mullane – STS-41-D, STS-27, STS-36
 Story Musgrave – STS-6, STS-51F, STS-33, STS-44, STS-61, STS-80

N
 Steven Nagel – STS-51-G, STS-61-A, STS-37, STS-55
 George Nelson – STS-41-C, STS-51-D, STS-26
 James Newman – STS-51, STS-69, STS-88, STS-109
 Carlos Noriega – STS-84, STS-97
 Lisa Nowak – STS-121
 Karen Nyberg – STS-124, Soyuz TMA-09M (Expedition 36/37)

O
 Ellen Ochoa – STS-56, STS-66, STS-96, STS-110
 Bryan O'Connor – STS-61-B, STS-40
 William Oefelein – STS-116
 John Olivas – STS-117, STS-128
 Ellison Onizuka – STS-51-C, STS-51-L
 Stephen Oswald – STS-42, STS-56, STS-67
 Robert Overmyer – STS-5, STS-51-B

P
 Scott Parazynski – STS-66, STS-86, STS-95, STS-100, STS-120
 Robert Parker – STS-9, STS-35
 Nicholas Patrick – STS-116, STS-130
 Donald Peterson – STS-6
 John Phillips – STS-100, Soyuz TMA-6 (Expedition 11), STS-119
 William Pogue – Skylab 4
 Alan Poindexter – STS-122, STS-131
 Mark Polansky – STS-98, STS-116, STS-127
 Charles Precourt – STS-55, STS-71, STS-84, STS-91

R
 William Readdy – STS-42, STS-51, STS-79
 Kenneth Reightler – STS-48, STS-60
 James Reilly – STS-89, STS-104, STS-117
 Garrett Reisman – STS-123/STS-124 (Expedition 16/17), STS-132
 Judith Resnik – STS-41-D, STS-51-L
 Paul Richards – STS-102
 Richard Richards – STS-28, STS-41, STS-50, STS-64
 Sally Ride – STS-7, STS-41-G
 Patricia Robertson
 Stephen Robinson – STS-85, STS-95, STS-114, STS-130
 Kent Rominger – STS-73, STS-80, STS-85, STS-96, STS-100
 Stuart Roosa – Apollo 14
 Jerry Ross – STS-61-B, STS-27, STS-37, STS-55, STS-74, STS-88, STS-110
 Mario Runco – STS-44, STS-54, STS-77

S
 Robert Satcher – STS-129
 Wally Schirra – Mercury-Atlas 8, Gemini 6A, Apollo 7
 Harrison Schmitt – Apollo 17
 Russell Schweickart – Apollo 9
 Francis Scobee – STS-41-C, STS-51-L
 David Scott – Gemini 8, Apollo 9, Apollo 15
 Winston Scott – STS-72, STS-87
 Richard Searfoss – STS-58, STS-76, STS-90
 Margaret Rhea Seddon – STS-51-D, STS-40, STS-58
 Elliot See
 Ronald Sega – STS-60, STS-76
 Piers Sellers – STS-112, STS-121, STS-132
 Brewster Shaw – STS-9, STS-61-B, STS-28
 Alan Shepard – Mercury-Redstone 3, Apollo 14
 William Shepherd – STS-27, STS-41, STS-52, Soyuz TM-31/STS-102 (Expedition 1)
 Loren Shriver – STS-51-C, STS-31, STS-46
 Deke Slayton – Apollo-Soyuz Test Project
 Michael Smith – STS-51-L
 Steven Smith – STS-68, STS-82, STS-103, STS-110
 Sherwood Spring – STS-61-B
 Robert Springer – STS-29, STS-38
 Thomas P. Stafford – Gemini 6A, Gemini 9A, Apollo 10, Apollo-Soyuz Test Project
 Heidemarie Stefanyshyn-Piper – STS-115, STS-126
 Robert Stewart – STS-41-B, STS-51-J
 Susan Still-Kilrain – STS-83, STS-94
 Nicole Stott – STS-128/STS-129 (Expedition 20/21), STS-133
 Frederick Sturckow – STS-88, STS-105, STS-117, STS-128
 Kathryn Sullivan – STS-41-G, STS-31, STS-45
 Steven Swanson – STS-117, STS-119, Soyuz TMA-12M (Expedition 39/40)
 Jack Swigert – Apollo 13

T
 Daniel Tani – STS-108, STS-120/STS-122 (Expedition 16)
 Norman Thagard – STS-7, STS-51-B, STS-30, STS-42, Soyuz TM-21/STS-71 (Mir EO-18)
 Joseph Tanner – STS-66, STS-82, STS-97, STS-115
 Andy Thomas – STS-77, STS-89/STS-91 (Mir EO-24/25), STS-102, STS-114
 Donald Thomas – STS-65, STS-70, STS-83, STS-94
 Kathryn Thornton – STS-33, STS-49, STS-61, STS-73
 William Thornton – STS-8, STS-51-B
 Pierre Thuot – STS-36, STS-49, STS-62
 Richard Truly – ALT, STS-2, STS-8

V
 James Van Hoften – STS-41-C, STS-51-I
 Charles Veach – STS-39, STS-52
 Terry Virts – STS-130, Soyuz TMA-15M (Expedition 42/43)
 James Voss – STS-44, STS-53, STS-69, STS-101, STS-102/STS-105 (Expedition 2)
 Janice Voss – STS-57, STS-63, STS-83, STS-94, STS-99

W
 Rex Walheim – STS-110, STS-122, STS-135
 David Walker – STS-51-A, STS-30, STS-53, STS-69
 Carl Walz – STS-51, STS-65, STS-79, STS-108/STS-111 (Expedition 4)
 Mary Weber – STS-70, STS-101
 Paul Weitz – Skylab 2, STS-6 
 James Wetherbee – STS-32, STS-52, STS-63, STS-86, STS-102, STS-113
 Ed White – Gemini 4, Apollo 1
 Peggy Whitson – STS-111/STS-113 (Expedition 5), Soyuz TMA-11 (Expedition 16), Soyuz MS-03/Soyuz MS-04 (Expedition 51/52/53)
 Terrence Wilcutt – STS-68, STS-79, STS-89, STS-106
 Clifton Williams
 Donald Williams – STS-51-D, STS-34
 Jeffrey Williams – STS-101, Soyuz TMA-8 (Expedition 13), Soyuz TMA-16 (Expedition 21/22), Soyuz TMA-20M (Expedition 47/48)
 Peter Wisoff – STS-57, STS-68, STS-81, STS-92
 David Wolf – STS-58, STS-86/STS-89 (Mir EO-24), STS-112, STS-127
 Neil Woodward
 Alfred Worden – Apollo 15

Y
 John Young – Gemini 3, Gemini 10, Apollo 10, Apollo 16, STS-1, STS-9

Z
 George Zamka – STS-120, STS-130

Selection groups
1959 Group 1 – "The Mercury Seven"
1962 Group 2 – "The New Nine"
1963 Group 3 – "The Fourteen"
1965 Group 4 – "The Scientists"
1966 Group 5 – "The Original 19"
1967 Group 6 – "The Excess Eleven (XS-11)"
1969 Group 7 – USAF MOL Transfer, no official nickname (Astronauts selected from the Manned Orbiting Laboratory program)
1978 Group 8 – "Thirty-Five New Guys (TFNG)" (class included first female candidates)
1980 Group 9 – "19+80"
1984 Group 10 – "The Maggots"
1985 Group 11 – no official nickname
1987 Group 12 – "The GAFFers"
1990 Group 13 – "The Hairballs"
1992 Group 14 – "The Hogs"
1994 Group 15 – "The Flying Escargot"
1996 Group 16 – "The Sardines" (largest class to date, 35 NASA candidates and nine international astronauts)
1998 Group 17 – "The Penguins"
2000 Group 18 – "The Bugs"
2004 Group 19 – "The Peacocks"
2009 Group 20 – "The Chumps"
2013 Group 21 – "The 8-Balls" (composed of four male and four female candidates; highest percentage of females)
2017 Group 22 – "The Turtles"
2022 Group 23 – "The Flies"

See also 
 Roscosmos Cosmonaut Corps
 Canadian Astronaut Corps
 Chinese Astronaut Corps
 European Astronaut Corps
 List of astronauts by selection
 Human spaceflight
 History of spaceflight

Notes

References 

Astronaut Candidate Program=== Citations ===

Sources

External links
 NASA Astronaut Candidate Program Brochure
 Current NASA Astronaut Corps Members
 Former NASA Astronaut Corps Members

 

Lists of astronauts
NASA lists
NASA astronauts
Human spaceflight programs